is a former Japanese football player. He played for Japan national team.

Club career
Yamashita was born in Fukuoka on November 21, 1977. After graduating from Higashi Fukuoka High School in 1996, he joined J1 League side Avispa Fukuoka. He made his professional debut on March 16, 1996. He scored his first professional goal on April 27, 1996 against Kyoto Purple Sanga. He played many matches from first season. However the club relegated to J2 League in 2001 and he moved to Vegalta Sendai. However the club relegated to J2 in 2003 again and he moved to Kashiwa Reysol in 2004. However his opportunity to play decreased. He also played in Omiya Ardija on loan in 2005. He moved to Japan Football League club Tochigi SC in 2007 and FC Ryukyu in 2008. He retired end of 2010 season.

National team career
In June 1997, Yamashita was selected Japan U-20 national team for 1997 World Youth Championship. He played in 2 matches.

In 2001, Yamashita was selected Japan national team for 2001 Confederations Cup. He made his international debut in the tournament on June 4, 2001 against Brazil at Kashima Soccer Stadium. At this tournament, Japan won the 2nd place. He earned 3 caps between 2001 and 2003 and scored no goals for Japan.

Club statistics

National team statistics

National team
 2001 Confederations Cup

Honors and awards

Team Honors
FIFA Confederations Cup Runner-up: 2001

References

External links

Japan National Football Team Database

1977 births
Living people
Association football people from Fukuoka Prefecture
Japanese footballers
Japan international footballers
Japan youth international footballers
J1 League players
J2 League players
Japan Football League players
Avispa Fukuoka players
Vegalta Sendai players
Kashiwa Reysol players
Omiya Ardija players
Tochigi SC players
FC Ryukyu players
Footballers at the 1998 Asian Games
2001 FIFA Confederations Cup players
Association football forwards
Asian Games competitors for Japan